Khunan (also Romanized as Khūnān and Khownān; also known as Khūshān) is a village in Zahray-ye Bala Rural District, in the Central District of Buin Zahra County, Qazvin Province, Iran. At the 2006 census, its population was 1,737, in 457 families.

References 

Populated places in Buin Zahra County